Stanmore and Canons Park Synagogue  is situated in Stanmore in the London Borough of Harrow, England, and had the largest community of any single Orthodox synagogue in Europe as of 2012. It is a constituent of the United Synagogue (mainstream Orthodox).

History

The congregation became affiliated with United Synagogue in 1946, becoming a district synagogue in 1952 and subsequently a constituent (member) synagogue.

Stanmore and Canons Park Synagogue has previously been called "Stanmore and Canons Park District Synagogue" and "Canons Park & District Hebrew Congregation".
 The current building (Main Shul) was consecrated on 18 March 1951 (Jewish Date: 10th Adar 5711) by Dayan Dr I. Grunfeld and Isaac Wolfson Esq. The Synagogue was actually built facing north rather than east (towards Jerusalem).
 The community centre was consecrated on 8 September 1963. The Freeman Susman Hall (above the community centre) is actually bigger than the main synagogue itself.
 The corridor between the main synagogue and the community centre was widened in an extension in 2002. As part of the extension a garden was established at the front of the building.
 The synagogue added a lift in 2008 so that disabled members could access all parts of the building.
 In 2014 the main shul was refurbished as well as half of the classrooms.

Rabbis

The senior rabbi in charge is Rabbi Mendel Lew, who has been in post since 2006.

Rabbi Avrom Chaitowitz (1921-1986) was minister from 1954 to 1986. He was educated at Etz Chaim Yeshiva and Jews College, London, where he obtained semicha in 1956. He served at St Albans Affiliated Synagogue (1949-1951) and Finsbury Park Synagogue (1951-1954) before coming to Stanmore. On his retirement he moved Jerusalem.

Rabbi Chaitowitz was followed by Rabbi Dr Jeffrey Cohen, who served the Synagogue for twenty years. Rabbi Cohen has been described as a champion of Modern Orthodoxy and promoted that philosophy for some 40 years within the Anglo-Jewish rabbinate, in the pages of the Anglo-Jewish press, and in his own writings. In that capacity, he was invited, at its inception, to become the rabbinic adviser and a governor of Immanuel College.

Rabbi Cohen is an author of theological works as well as over two hundred articles in popular journals and newspapers. He has published more than 25 books in the past 30 years, the most recent being The Psalms: Poetry in Poetry (2018) and 'Genesis in Poetry' (2019), both published by Wipf & Stock, Oregon, USA. He is in great demand, by schools, synagogues, and literary groups, to give poetry readings. During the Corona Pandemic (June 2020), the BBC's evening ITN News programme invited poets to video and submit one of their poems related to the situation. Six were to be chosen, with one to be televised each evening for one week at the end of the 6pm News. His poem, 'Do I believe in angels?' was one of those chosen.

Youth activities
Stanmore and Canons Park Synagogue is well known for its youth activities. Stanmore provides a huge variety of programmes for the youth of the community. This includes trips, plays, youth clubs, Jewish Learning and external groups. Stanmore is also well known for its "Learn To Lead" programme, which is now also used in Bushey, Radlett, Edgware and many other communities following its enormous success in Stanmore.

Youth clubs and Jewish Learning
A range of clubs during the week that take place in the community centre or the "Youth Lounge".  As for Jewish learning, the synagogue runs a Beit Midrash programme where sixth formers can pair up with older Chavrutahs to learn texts or discuss issues.

Learn to Lead
Learn to Lead is an extensive programme where young people are given the opportunity to run the activities for the younger children. This starts with weekly sessions then the Learn to Lead Israel Trip (February Half term year 9), the Prague Trip (February Half Term  year 10), the Leadership Weekend and finally the Tribe Poland Trip. The programme is linked closely with Tribe and many of the leaders Stanmore produces go on to lead in other communities.

External groups
There are several groups that either are run by the synagogue, are affiliated with the synagogue or use the synagogue's community centre as a venue.

16th Edgware Scout Group which includes Beavers, Cubs and Scouts has held its weekly meetings in the Synagogue's premises since its inception in 1958.

Phoenix Jewish Explorer Scouts meet in the community centre weekly.

2/6th Stanmore Brownies, 6th Stanmore Guides and 1st Stanmore Rainbows Rainbows also have their meetings in the community centre.

Bnei Akiva, a worldwide Jewish youth movement, has a branch in Stanmore, as well as JLGB.

Tribe
Stanmore's various trips are usually connected with Tribe (Tribe Poland Trip). Year 9–13 participates in the Tribe Football Frenzy.

Publications

 Stanmore and Canons Park Synagogue has a weekly leaflet that is given out on Friday night and Saturday morning.  The front cover contains details about the Parashah and a thought from the Rabbi. The middle pages list any celebrations and bereavements in the past week and a list of events happening in the following week. The back page shows which members of the community will be leading/ participating in various sections of the prayer. The leaflet was started in 1994.
 The Youth Service produce their own leaflet called Achlah (meaning 'Cool' in Hebrew). It was started in 2004 and the name was briefly changed to T-Weekly mid-2007.
 The synagogue produces a biannual magazine called the Habima.
 Stanmore has its own Birkat Hamazon (Grace After Meals) book, which features a picture of the synagogue on the cover. The book includes Kiddush, Shabbat Zemirot (songs that are traditionally sung on Shabbat), songs for Seudah Shlishit (third meal) and finally Birkat Hamazon.
 The shul provide the Daf Hashevua, which is a leaflet distributed to all United Synagogue shuls.
 The shuls' members compiled a series of essay and thoughts on each week's Parasha which was named 'The Friday Night Companion'.

References

External links

Stanmore Learning Centre
Stanmore Youth Youtube Page
Stanmore and Canons Park Synagogue on Jewish Communities and Records – UK (hosted by jewishgen.org).

Synagogues in London
Religion in the London Borough of Harrow
Orthodox synagogues in England
Synagogues completed in 1951
Stanmore
1951 establishments in England
1946 establishments in England